Hold Me may refer to:

Music

Albums 
 Hold Me (Laura Branigan album) or the title song (see below), 1985
 Hold Me (Zard album), 1992
 Hold Me (EP), by Jamie Grace, or the title song, 2011

Songs 
 "Hold Me" (1933 song), written by Jack Little, David Oppenheim, and Ira Schuster
 "Hold Me" (Anouk & Douwe Bob song), 2015
 "Hold Me" (Barbara Mandrell song), 1977
 "Hold Me" (Earth, Wind & Fire song), 2003
 "Hold Me" (Fleetwood Mac song), 1982
 "Hold Me" (K. T. Oslin song), 1988
 "Hold Me" (Laura Branigan song), 1985
 "Hold Me" (Menudo song), 1985
 "Hold Me" (Sandhja song), 2013
 "Hold Me" (Savage Garden song), 1999
 "Hold Me" (Sheila E. song), 1987
 "Hold Me" (Teddy Pendergrass and Whitney Houston song), 1984
 "Hold Me" (Tom Odell song), 2013
 "Hold Me" (Yoko Ono song), 2013
 "Hold Me", by Brian McKnight from Anytime, 1997
 "Hold Me", by Carl Wilson from Carl Wilson, 1981
 "Hold Me", by Duran Duran from Notorious, 1986
 "Hold Me", by England Dan & John Ford Coley from Some Things Don't Come Easy, 1978
 "Hold Me", by Farid Mammadov, representing Azerbaijan in the Eurovision Song Contest 2013
 "Hold Me", by For Real from Free, 1996
 "Hold Me", by Kenny Rogers from Eyes That See in the Dark, 1983
 "Hold Me", by Rebecca Ferguson from Superwoman, 2016
 "Hold Me", by R3hab, 2017
 "Hold Me", by Status Quo from In Search of the Fourth Chord, 2007
 "Hold Me", by Weezer from Make Believe, 2005

See also